The Back Bone Shadow is a family of French paramotors that was designed by Thierry Simonet and produced by Back Bone of Tallard for powered paragliding. Now out of production, when it was available the aircraft was supplied complete and ready-to-fly.

Design and development
The Shadow was designed to comply with the US FAR 103 Ultralight Vehicles rules as well as European regulations. It features a paraglider-style wing, single-place accommodation and a single engine in pusher configuration. Each model in the line is named for its metric propeller diameter.

As is the case with all paramotors, take-off and landing is accomplished by foot. Inflight steering is accomplished via handles that actuate the canopy brakes, creating roll and yaw.

Variants
Shadow 100
Model with a  RDM 100 engine in pusher configuration with a 4:1 ratio reduction drive and a  diameter two-bladed wooden propeller.
Shadow 113
Model with a  RDM 100 engine in pusher configuration with a 4:1 ratio reduction drive and a  diameter two-bladed wooden propeller.
Shadow 115
Model with a  RDM 100 engine in pusher configuration with a 4:1 ratio reduction drive and a  diameter two-bladed wooden propeller.

Shadow 100 specifications

References

Shadow
2000s French ultralight aircraft
Single-engined pusher aircraft
Paramotors